Gayathri Raguram  is an Indian politician and former actress who has worked in the South Indian film industry. Gayathri began her career as an actress in the 2001 Telugu film Repallelo Radha and after a career break, she began working as a choreographer in films from 2008 to 2019.

In 2014 she entered politics and became a member in the BJP. She was the president of Arts and Culture Wing of Tamil Nadu BJP from 2020 to 2022. She resigned from BJP in January 2023.

Personal life 

Gayathri was born on 23 April 1984 in a Tamil Brahmin Iyer family as the second daughter to dance choreographers Raghuram and Girija Raghuram. Her elder sister Suja is a prominent dancer, who has also previously worked as an actress. She is the great-granddaughter of director Krishnaswami Subrahmanyam. Her mother, Girija comes from a family of choreographers, which includes Brinda and Kala. In August 2006, Gayathri had an arranged marriage with US-based software engineer Deepak Chandrasekar in California and the pair subsequently held a Hindu ceremony in December 2006 which was attended by several actors and politicians from Tamil Nadu. In 2008, Gayathri filed for divorce on the grounds of domestic abuse from Deepak and his parents. The divorce was subsequently granted in 2010.

Drunk and driving case 
Gayathri was booked for a drunk and driving case in November 2019 by Abhiramapuram Traffic Control Police. Police reported that she left a party from a hotel in MRC Nagar organized for film personalities and was on her way home when she was intercepted by the police, she admitted that she had drunk alcohol when she was asked to blow into the breathing analyzer. A police officer later drove her to her house in Adyar and confiscated her car. A case under Section 185 of the Motor Vehicles Act was filed on her and she was also fined for the incident. Gayathri however claimed it was fake news. This incident drew strong criticism from BJP party cadres.

Twitter
On 26 October 2020, Raguram was permanently suspended from social media platform Twitter for violating Twitter's rules after posting a series of tweets relating to the controversy over VCK leader Thol. Thirumavalavan's statement on Manusmriti.

Film career
Gayathri Raghuram started acting at the age of fourteen. Early in her career, she insisted on being known by her full name to avoid confusion with another actress, Gayatri Jayaraman, who was also active in the period. She initially was cast in S. Thanu's production Enna Solla Pogiray in 2001, but the project was later dropped.

Her debut film, Repallelo Radha featured her alongside newcomer Dileep. Her next film, Sakthi Chidambaram's comedy drama Charlie Chaplin (2002), featured her in an ensemble cast alongside Prabhu Deva, Prabhu and Abhirami. She was selected for the film after Gayatri Jayaraman opted out of the project. The film enjoyed commercial success, with a critic from The Hindu stating "the new heroine's expertise in dance is particularly impressive". In 2002, she appeared in three more films: the Kannada film Manasella Neene directed by choreographer Sundaram, the Tamil film Style alongside choreographer Raghava Lawrence and the Malayalam film, Nakshathrakkannulla Rajakumaran Avanundoru Rajakumari, where she starred opposite Prithviraj. Her four consequent releases in 2003 fared less well at the box office and failed to garner her more film offers. In concern of her performance in the horror film Whistle (2003), a critic from The Hindu wrote "Gayathri Raghuram's face is and her expressions are just right but rotundity seems to come in the way of wholesome appeal". Likewise, a critic wrote "Gayathri, as the garrulous friend of the hero, begins well, and even when you think she might have a solid role to play, she turns out to be just another weighty heroine in tow", in regard of her appearance in the Arjun-starrer Parasuram (2003). Subsequently, she quit films and relocated to pursue a qualification in Visual Communications in Iowa, USA.

Gayathri returned to the film industry in 2008 as a choreographer with films like Jayam Kondaan (2008) and Poi Solla Porom (2008) and has since worked in big budget productions including Madrasapattinam (2010), Deiva Thirumagal (2013), Osthe (2011) and Anjaan (2014). Her work in the crime thriller Kanthaswamy (2009) and the satire Tamil Padam (2010) were well received by critics. By 2014, she had choreographed around 100 films and has regularly specialised in working on romantic montages.

Gayatri acted once more in Vai Raja Vai (2015) at the insistence of her friend Aishwarya Dhanush by portraying the sister of the film's lead character Gautham Karthik. Likewise, she made an extended guest appearance in director Bala's village drama Tharai Thappattai (2016), where she also featured in a karakattam-based song. After announcing her intentions of directing a film in 2012, she began work on her first directorial venture Yaadhumagi Nindraai during 2016.

Bigg Boss 
In 2017, Gayathri was a contestant on the Tamil reality show Bigg Boss hosted by Kamal Haasan. She was evicted from the show o the 56th day, after having attracted widespread criticism for her behaviour inside the Bigg Boss House. In particular, her constant harassment and bullying of contestants Bharani, Julie and then Oviya were widely criticised. A police complaint was filed against her for using derogatory words against Oviya by saying that Oviya has seri behaviour (Slum behaviour) and hurting the sentiment of others, while on the show. Post her appearance on the show, Gayathri returned to choreography, and also appeared as a judge on the television show, Mrs Chinnathirai.

Political career
In November 2015, Gayathri was appointed as Bharatiya Janata Party's secretary for arts in Tamil Nadu. She had earlier joined the party in 2014 in the presence of BJP president Amit Shah.

Gayathri Raghuram was made as president of Arts and Culture Wing of Tamil Nadu BJP in July 2020.

BJP president Tamilisai distanced herself from Gayathri Raghuram in November 2018 when Gayathri landed into a controversy for drunk and driving. Tamilisai told reporters that the actor was no longer a party worker. Gayathri tweeted that Tamilisai threatened and blackmails women. Gayathri has ever since started a campaign against Tamilisai and has gone on television and party members and said that the BJP will grow in Tamil Nadu if the leadership is changed.

As the state president of the arts and culture wing, during February 2022, she fired some of her wing's office-bearers and  ordered appointment of new executives to replace them allegedly without the without permission of party President Annamalai. Gayatri Raghuram's arbitrary act caused a controversy. However, Annamalai ordered that Gayathri's announcement is not valid and said that the old executives would continue. Gayathri Raghuram was expelled from the post by party President Kuppusamy Annamalai in May 2022 and was not given any new post. She openly expressed her displeasure on social media, saying she was given the post of  language cell convenor, but she turned it down. She said she was "ok" without a posting. She was then appointed as the leader of Tamil development wing of other states and abroad in June 2022.

Gayatri Raghuram in November 2022, condemned the party's OBC state president Surya Siva for abusing and giving death threats to BJP's Minority Morcha leader Daisy Saran, and criticized the party's state president K. Annamalai for giving the post to Surya Siva. Following this, K. Annamalai suspended her from the party for six months and issued a statement asking party men to avoid any contact with Gayatri Raghuram for the time due to her continued involvement in tarnishing the name of the party. 

She quit the party on 3 January 2023, alleging that 'women in the party' are not safe under leader K. Annamalai.

Filmography

Actress

Director 
Yaadhumagi Nindraai (2020)

Producer 
Yaadhumagi Nindraai (2020)

Choreographer 

Jayam Kondaan (2008) 
Poi Solla Porom (2008) 
Panchamirtham (2008)
Kanthaswamy (2009) 
Kola Kolaya Mundhirika (2009) 
Daddy Cool (2009) 
Madrasapattinam (2010)
Tamil Padam (2010)
Anwar (2010)
Osthe (2011) 
Makeup Man(2011) 
Salt N' Pepper (2011) 
I Love Me (2012) 
Scene Onnu Nammude Veedu (2012) 
No.66 Madurai Bus (2012) 
Aravaan (2012) 
Kadhalil Sodhappuvadhu Yeppadi (2012) 
Deiva Thirumagal (2013)
Samsaaram Aarogyathinu Haanikaram (2013)
SIM (2013)
Thalaivaa (2013)
Memories (2013)
Anjaan (2014)
To Noora with Love (2014)
Iyobinte Pusthakam (2014)
Nimirndhu Nil (2014)
Kaaviya Thalaivan (2014)
100 Days of Love (2015)
Kadavul Paathi Mirugam Paathi (2015)
Chandrettan Evideya (2015)
Ennu Ninte Moideen (2015) 
As I'm Suffering From Kadhal (2017)
Thalaivi  (2021)
Maha

Television 

Chinna Chinna Aasai- Uravu (1995) - Baby Pooja 
Jodi Number One
Dancing Khilladies
Genes
Kitchen Galatta
Koffee with DD
Odi Vilayadu Pappa (2016)-Judge
Bigg Boss (2017)-Contestant - Evicted Day 56
Mrs. Chinnathirai (2017)-Judge
Divided (2018)-Contestant
Bigg Boss 2 (2018) - Guest

References

External links 

1984 births
Living people
Actresses in Tamil cinema
Actresses from Chennai
Actresses in Telugu cinema
Actresses in Malayalam cinema
21st-century Indian actresses
Indian film choreographers
Indian women choreographers
Indian choreographers
Dancers from Tamil Nadu
Tamil film directors
Indian women film directors
Film directors from Chennai
Actresses in Kannada cinema
Bigg Boss (Tamil TV series) contestants
Tamil Nadu politicians